Mount McIntosh is a mountain rising to about  in the western part of the Kyle Hills, on Ross Island, Antarctica. The mountain is conspicuous because of diagonal bands of rock and ice on the north face. It was named by the Advisory Committee on Antarctic Names in 2000, at the suggestion of Philip R. Kyle, after geologist William C. McIntosh of the New Mexico Institute of Mining and Technology. McIntosh worked extensively in Antarctica under United States Antarctic Program auspices and in support of Kyle's investigations on Mount Erebus, making his first trip to Mount Erebus in 1977–78, and at least 15 trips through 1999.

References

Mountains of Ross Island